"What a Beautiful Name" is a song by Australian praise and worship group Hillsong Worship. The song, written and led by Brooke Ligertwood and co-written with Ben Fielding, refers to the promise of salvation through Jesus Christ as represented by His Holy Name. The "genre-smashing single" contributed to Hillsong being named Billboards Top Christian Artist of 2017. "What a Beautiful Name" won two Dove Awards for Song of the Year and Worship Song of the Year in 2017. It won the 2018 Grammy Award for Best Contemporary Christian Music Performance/Song. "What a Beautiful Name" was released on 6 January 2017, as the lead single from their 25th live album, Let There Be Light (2016).

Background
"What a Beautiful Name" was composed in December 2015 in Sydney, Australia, for the upcoming Hillsong Conference, the annual church gathering.

Composition
According to sheet music published at Sheetmusicdirect.com by Hillsong Publishing, "What a Beautiful Name" is a slow ballad that consists of 68 beats per minute. Written in common time, the song is in the key of D major. Brooke Ligertwood's vocal range spans from A3 to B4 during the song.

Music video
A video for the song was recorded at the Hillsong Conference in Sydney and was released on 30 September 2016. The YouTube video has more than 450 million views as of 28 July 2022.

Reception
Music critic Matt Collar praised Hillsong Worship for their "passionate, faith-based sound" and wrote that fans of the group "will surely appreciate this emotive, uplifting Christian pop."

Jake Gosselin attributes the popularity of the song in the Christian community to a number of factors. He writes that "What a Beautiful Name" is "singable." In practice this refers to the "small vocal range" of the song which is "one note over an octave." This translates to a song that is easy to sing and which does not strain the voice with notes that are too high or too low. He also comments that the song is written in the key of D which is "the optimal key for both men and women."

Chart performance
"What a Beautiful Name" had its worldwide digital release on 6 January 2017, and topped Billboard's Hot Christian Songs chart on 25 February. The single has held the top position for 37 weeks making it the third-longest-leading No. 1 in the 14-year history of the Hot Christian chart. The song which claims the distinction as the longest-leading No. 1 is "Oceans (Where Feet May Fail)" and was released by another Hillsong unit, Hillsong United. "Oceans" led the Hot Christian chart for 61 weeks. The song has stayed on the chart for 77 weeks, making it the third longest running song on the chart.

"What a Beautiful Name" is ranked as the No. 1 song of the year for 2017 on the Christian Digital Sales chart, No. 3 on Christian Streaming Songs, and is also the No. 3 song on Christian Airplay. The song spent nine weeks as No. 1 on Christian Airplay and was Hillsong Worship's first No. 1 on the chart. What a Beautiful Name also leads the CCLI, the international licensing service for 250,000 churches.

"What a Beautiful Name" is a track from Hillsong Worship's 25th live album, Let There Be Light. The album was released on 14 October 2016, and debuted as No. 1 on the Top Christian Albums chart. For 2017, Let There be Light was ranked the No. 9 of the year.

Awards and accolades
Hillsong Worship was named Billboard's Top Christian Artist of 2017, as well as Top Christian Duo/Group. "What a Beautiful Name" earned two Dove awards, Song of the Year and Worship Song of the Year. "What a Beautiful Name" won the award for Best Contemporary Christian Music Performance/Song at the 60th Grammy Awards, the first for Hillsong Worship.

Criticism of lyric
Theologian and pastor John Piper criticized the song, in particular the lyric ‘You didn’t want heaven without us / So Jesus, you brought heaven down’:

Another pastor, Sam Storms also acknowledged criticisms of the lyric.

Hillsong responded to the criticisms of the song with a blog by singer Ben Fielding. Fielding cited John 17:24 and other verses to defend the scriptural inspiration behind the criticized lyric.

Live performances
The song was recorded at a live performance at the annual Hillsong Conference in 2016. Hillsong performed the song at the 48th Annual Dove Awards held at Allen Arena in Nashville. The performance was well received and "had audience members on their feet with their hands in the air."

When asked about performing the song in an interview with Billboards Jim Asker, Ligertwood said about the audience: 
Finally, she said about performing the song:

Other versions
In July 2017, the Voices of Lee, the "elite" a cappella singing group, posted a video of the song to their Facebook page. The cover was an instant hit and reached the so-called viral threshold of 5 million views in two days. As of October 2017, it had amassed 33 million views. The group represents Lee University in Tennessee; the video was filmed in the school's chapel.

Track listing

Charts

Decade-end charts

Certifications

Release history

Further reading

References

External links
 "What a Beautiful Name" video 
 "The Story Behind What a Beautiful Name" video
 Lyrics and chords

2017 singles
2016 songs
2010s ballads
Sparrow Records singles
Songs written by Brooke Fraser
Hillsong Worship songs